Amne Machin, Anyi Machen, or Anyê Maqên ("Grandfather Pomra") is the highest peak of a mountain range of the same name in the southeast of Qinghai province, China. It is revered in Tibetan Buddhism as the home of the chief indigenous deity of Amdo, Machen Pomra.

Geography
The entire Amne Machin range is an eastern extension of the Kunlun Mountains, a major mountain system of Asia. The Amne Machin range runs in the general northwest-to-southeast direction in eastern Qinghai (Golog Tibetan Autonomous Prefecture and the adjacent areas of the Hainan Tibetan Autonomous Prefecture) and the southwestern corner of Gansu's Gannan Tibetan Autonomous Prefecture.

The existence of the ridge results in one of the great bends of the Yellow River. The river first flows for several hundreds of kilometers toward the east and southeast, along the south-western side of the Amne Machin Range. In so doing it crosses the entire length of  Golog Prefecture, and reaches the borders of Gansu and Sichuan. Then  the river turns almost 180 degrees to the left, passing to the northeastern side of the Amne Machin, and flows toward the northwest for 200–300 km through several prefectures of the northeastern Qinghai.

The Amne Machin Peak (the highest point of the range) is located in Maqên County of Golog Prefecture. It is ranked number 23 in height among the mountain peaks of China.

A part of the range around its highest peak has been declared a section of the Sanjiangyuan ("Sources of Three Rivers") National Nature Reserve.

History 

The mountain was known to the ancient Chinese as Mount Jishi (Jīshíshān). The Northern Wei-era commentary on the Han-era River Classic stated that the mountain was the site where Yu the Great tamed the Yellow River and that it was considered part of Longxi Commandery, located 1740 li from Kunlun Mountain and 5000 li from the Luo.

The massif had long been considered a sacred mountain and a place of pilgrimage, when before the Communist takeover up to 10,000 Golok people would make the 120-mile circumambulation of the mountain each year. The first European to describe the mountain was the British explorer Brigadier-General George Pereira on his expedition on foot from Peking to Lhasa of 1921–2, sometimes reckoned one of the great geographical discoveries of the twentieth century.  Pereira, who saw Amne Machin from about 70 miles away, thought its "height must be at least 25,000 feet [7,600 m], and might be anything; it dwarfed all other mountains near it."

However, the massif remained unclimbed until 1960. The Amne Machin mountains had been overflown by a few American pilots who overestimated the elevation to 30,000 feet (9,100 m). A 1930 article of the National Geographic estimated the peak elevation to 28,000 feet [8,500 m] according to the report of Joseph Rock, an American botanist and explorer who, despite death threats from the Golog Tibetans, had ventured to within 80 km of the mountain. For a while, the mountains were considered as a possible place for a peak higher than Mount Everest.

Climbing history
In 1960, a Chinese expedition climbed the mountain, but it was demonstrated in 1980 that this expedition climbed Amne Machin II (Roche's Chenrezig, 6,268 m), 7 km SSE from the highest summit.

In 1981, Amne Machin I (Dradullunshog) was reached near-simultaneously by three groups, each of which had been led to believe they were the first and only ones to obtain a permit from the Chinese government. A Japanese expedition approached the summit from the south and put Giichiro Watanabe, Yoshio Yamamoto and Katsumi Miyake on top on May 22, 1981, and five other expedition members 3 days later. Within three weeks, the American climbers Galen Rowell, Harold Knutsen and Kim Schmitz made an Alpine-style ascent over the East ridge of the NE summit to reach the main summit on June 9. They did not see any evidence of an earlier ascent. The very next day Siegfried Hupfauer, Hans Gaschbauer, Franz Lämmerhofer, Gerhard Schmatz and Peter Vogler of an Austro-German expedition reached the summit as well. They had followed the Japanese route and the 3000 feet of fixed rope they encountered en route convinced them that the Japanese had been the first to summit. The mountain remained busy that summer, as Kim Schmitz returned to the summit with two Canadian clients on June 12, another Japanese party summited in August, and in September an Australian team climbed the impressive NE face and descended over the 6 km long unclimbed NNE ridge.

In popular culture
 "Beyond the Great Snow Mountains", The Collected Short Stories of Louis L'Amour, Vol. 4, Part 1:  Adventure Stories.

References

Citations

Sources 

 Pereira, Cecil. "Peking to Lhasa (From the Diaries of the Late Brig.-Gen. George Pereira)" The Geographical Journal, Vol. 64, No. 2 (Aug., 1924), pp. 97–117.  The elevation estimate is on p. 104.
 Lamaist Sites of the Amny Machen Region (Golog), in: Andreas Gruschke: The Cultural Monuments of Tibet’s Outer Provinces: Amdo - Volume 1. The Qinghai Part of Amdo. Bangkok, 2001, pp. 73–90.
 Sir Francis Younghusband and George Pereira, Peking to Lhasa; The Narrative of Journeys in the Chinese Empire Made by the Late Brigadier-General George Pereira (London: Constable and Company, 1925).

Further reading 
 Leonard Clark The Marching Wind (New York Funk and Wagnalls, 1954)

External links 
 Time magazine from 1948 about the Amne Machin mountains
 Life magazine article from 1949 about Amne Machin.
 Galen A. Rowell, On and Around Anyemaqen
 Google map satellite view of the Amne Machin mountains

Mountain ranges of China
Sacred mountains
Mountains of Qinghai
Six-thousanders of the Kunlun